Part 2, Sounder is a 1976 American drama film directed by William A. Graham.  It is the sequel to the 1972 Oscar-nominated film Sounder, which in turn is based on William H. Armstrong's Newbery Award-winning novel of the same name.  Although Lonne Elder III and Robert B. Radnitz returned as screenwriter and producer respectively, neither Martin Ritt nor any of the cast members from the first film participated in the sequel, with the exception of Taj Mahal, who reprised his role as Ike and returned as composer.  According to Bob McCann, the film was "barely released."

Plot

Cast
Harold Sylvester as Nathan Lee Morgan
Ebony Wright as Rebecca Morgan
Taj Mahal as Ike Phillips
Darryl Young as David Lee Morgan
Erica Young as Josie Mae
Annazette Chase as Camille Johnson

Reception
Roger Ebert gave the film two stars. Richard Eder, reviewing the film for The New York Times, called it "unrelievedly didactic" and "a depressed kind of film, with a lot of gloominess and teeth-gritting".

References

External links
 
 

1976 films
1976 drama films
African-American drama films
American drama films
American sequel films
1970s English-language films
Films based on children's books
Films directed by William Graham (director)
Films set in Louisiana
Films set in the 1930s
Films shot in Louisiana
1970s American films